The Madagascar women's national under-16 basketball team is a national basketball team of Madagascar, governed by the Fédération Malagasy de Basket-Ball.
It represents the country in international under-16 (under age 16) women's basketball competitions.

See also
Madagascar women's national basketball team
Madagascar men's national under-16 basketball team

References

External links
Archived records of Madagascar team participations

Basketball in Madagascar
Basketball teams in Madagascar
Women's national under-16 basketball teams
Basketball